Irvine Creek is a creek in the municipality of Centre Wellington, Wellington County in southwestern Ontario, Canada. It is in the Great Lakes Basin and is a right tributary of the Grand River.

The creek begins at the confluence of two unnamed tributary streams in geographic West Garafraxa Township near the settlement of Dracon and flows southeast towards Lake Belwood. Before reaching the lake, it then turns southwest, then northwest and reaches the settlement of Living Springs. It turns southwest, passes under Ontario Highway 6, enters geographic Nichol Township, and reaches the community of Salem. The creek then flows southwest and reaches its mouth at the Grand River at the community of Elora. The Grand River flows to Lake Erie.

See also

 David Street Bridge - a vehicular bridge that crosses over Irvine Creek.

References

Rivers of Wellington County, Ontario
Tributaries of the Grand River (Ontario)